The men's hammer throw event was part of the track and field athletics programme at the 1948 Summer Olympics. The competition was held on July 31. There were 24 competitors from 17 nations. The maximum number of athletes per nation had been set at 3 since the 1930 Olympic Congress. The final was won by Imre Németh of Hungary. It was the nation's first medal in the men's hammer throw. Ivan Gubijan of Yugoslavia took silver; that nation also earned its first medal in the event. Robert Bennett of the United States received the bronze medal, returning the American team to the podium after a one-Games absence.

Background

This was the 10th appearance of the event, which has been held at every Summer Olympics except 1896. One of the 17 finalists from the pre-war 1936 Games returned: ninth-place finisher Henry Dreyer of the United States. The favorite was Imre Németh of Hungary, who had broken the world record two weeks before the Games. His strongest competition consisted of German throwers, who could not compete because Germany was not invited to the Games as a result of World War II. Bo Ericson of Sweden was expected to be the biggest contender to Németh.

India and South Korea each made their debut in the event. The United States appeared for the 10th time, the only nation to have competed at each appearance of the event to that point.

Competition format

The competition used the two-round format introduced in 1936, with the qualifying round completely separate from the divided final. In qualifying, each athlete received three attempts; those recording a mark of at least 49.00 metres advanced to the final. If fewer than 12 athletes achieved that distance, the top 12 would advance. The results of the qualifying round were then ignored. Finalists received three throws each, with the top six competitors receiving an additional three attempts. The best distance among those six throws counted.

Records

Prior to the competition, the existing world and Olympic records were as follows.

No new world or Olympic records were set during the competition.

Schedule

All times are British Summer Time (UTC+1)

Results

Qualifying

Qual. rule: qualification standard 49.00m (Q) or at least best 12 qualified (q).

Final

References

External links
Organising Committee for the XIV Olympiad, The (1948). The Official Report of the Organising Committee for the XIV Olympiad. LA84 Foundation. Retrieved 5 September 2016.

Athletics at the 1948 Summer Olympics
Hammer throw at the Olympics
Men's events at the 1948 Summer Olympics